Walenty Wilhelm Wańkowicz (February 14, 1799 in Kałużyce - May 12, 1842 in Paris) was a Polish painter of Belarusian origin. He studied at the Jesuit College in Polotsk, the University of Wilno and the Imperial Academy of Arts in St. Petersburg. He produced, among other things, a well-known portrait of Adam Mickiewicz (1827–28).

Legacy
Wańkowicz is honored in Belarus as one of the most important 19th-century painters of Belarusian origin. There is a monument to him in Minsk.

The Vankovich House / Wańkowicz House, the former mansion of the Wańkowicz family, is now a museum in the historical part of Minsk.

Selected portraits

Sources
 M. Domański, Walenty Wańkowicz - artysta i przyjaciel Mickiewicza, "Rota", 1997 nr 4.
 Jan Marek Giżycki, Materyały do dziejów Akademii Połockiej i szkół od niej zależnych, 1905

See also
 List of painters by name
 List of Poles

References

1799 births
1842 deaths
People from Byerazino District
People from Igumensky Uyezd
Ruthenian nobility
Clan of Lis
Belarusian painters
19th-century Polish painters
19th-century Polish male artists
Jesuit College in Polotsk alumni
Vilnius University alumni
Burials at Montmartre Cemetery
Polish male painters